WOCT-LP (101.9 FM, "Oshkosh Community Radio") is a radio station broadcasting a variety music format. Licensed to Oshkosh, Wisconsin, United States, the station is currently owned by The Friends of OCM.

References

External links
 
 

OCT-LP
OCT-LP
Oshkosh, Wisconsin
Community radio stations in the United States